Bruno Cortês Barbosa (born 11 March 1987), known as Bruno Cortez, is a Brazilian professional footballer who plays as a left back for Mirassol.

Cortez changed his surname spelling from Cortês to Cortez, without circumflex diacritic and with a final z ending after being asked to do so by the Nova Iguaçu club president. After leaving his youth club, Cortez decided to keep the spelling as an artistic name.

Club career

Early career
Born in Rio de Janeiro, he began his career as a forward in 2006, as part of 's squad. He was loaned to Paysandu in 2007, when he played a single game, against Tuna Luso in the Campeonato Paraense.

Cortez first professional contract was with Qatari club Al-Shahaniya in 2007. He moved back to his home country to play for Rio de Janeiro state-based club Castelo Branco from 2008 to 2009,. He left the club to defend Quissamã, also from Rio de Janeiro state, for the 2009 and 2010 seasons. He joined Nova Iguaçu in 2011, playing 14 Campeonato Carioca games for the club during that season. In March of the same year, Nova Iguaçu received a bid from Remo for the defender but rejected the offer.

Botafogo
Rio de Janeiro city-based club Botafogo acquired 50% of his economic rights after the conclusion of the Campeonato Carioca. He played 28 Série A games for the club during the 2011 season. Cortez played his first game for the club on 22 May 2011, at Estádio Benedito Teixeira, in São José do Rio Preto, on a 2–0 defeat against Palmeiras. He played his last match for Botafogo on 4 December 2011, on a 1–1 tie against Fluminense at Estádio Raulino de Oliveira, in Volta Redonda, for the last round of the Série A.

São Paulo
Cortez transfer to Série A club São Paulo was announced on 17 December 2011, with the contract being signed four days later. He played his first game for the Tricolor on 22 January 2012, in a 4–0 victory against Botafogo-SP at the Estádio do Morumbi, for the Campeonato Paulista championship. He scored his first goal for São Paulo on 23 May 2012, against Goiás, at the Estádio Serra Dourada, for the year's Copa do Brasil.

In May 2013, after São Paulo knock-off from both the State League and Copa Libertadores, Cortez was removed from the club's roster by president Juvenal Juvêncio and manager Ney Franco and, alongside four other players, transfer-listed.

Benfica (loan)
São Paulo loaned Cortez to Portuguese Primeira Liga side Benfica for a year in July 2013. Arriving at the Portuguese side, he stated that playing in Europe was his opportunity to earn a spot back at the Brazilian squad and end his two-year absence.

Falling out of favour at Jorge Jesus' squad, Cortez ended his loan spell on 11 January 2014 and returned to São Paulo. Cortez was reported stating  "I'll be eternally thankful to the Portuguese club for everything that they did for me and to Jorge Jesus for the opportunity. It didn't work out due to things that happen in football, but I'm positive that I left with an open door."

Criciúma (loan)
São Paulo loaned Cortez again, this time to Criciúma in April 2014 for the duration of the 2014 season.

Albirex Niigata (loan)
On 20 January 2015, Cortez signed a two-year loan deal with Albirex Niigata.

Grêmio
After two years playing in Japan, Cortez came back to Brazil in 2017 and discusses his contractual rescission with São Paulo. At this moment, Cortez prioritize to play in his home country. He joined Grêmio shortly after cutting ties with São Paulo.

International career
Cortez was called up for the Brazil national football team to compete against Argentina in both Superclásico das Américas matches, and was capped for the first time in the 2-0 Brazil victory on 14 September 2011 at the Estadio Mario Alberto Kempes in Córdoba. He also appeared in the second leg on 28 September at the Mangueirão in Belém.

Career statistics

Club

International

Honours

Club
São Paulo
Copa Sudamericana: 2012

Benfica
Primeira Liga: 2013–14
Taça de Portugal: 2013–14

Grêmio
Copa Libertadores: 2017
Recopa Sudamericana: 2018
Campeonato Gaúcho: 2018, 2019, 2020, 2021
Recopa Gaúcha: 2019

International
Brazil
Superclásico de las Américas: 2011

Individual
 Campeonato Brasileiro Série A Team of the Year: 2011

References

External links

1987 births
Living people
Footballers from Rio de Janeiro (city)
Brazilian footballers
Association football fullbacks
Campeonato Brasileiro Série A players
Paysandu Sport Club players
Quissamã Futebol Clube players
Nova Iguaçu Futebol Clube players
Botafogo de Futebol e Regatas players
São Paulo FC players
Criciúma Esporte Clube players
Grêmio Foot-Ball Porto Alegrense players
Avaí FC players
Primeira Liga players
S.L. Benfica footballers
J1 League players
Albirex Niigata players
Brazil international footballers
Brazilian expatriate footballers
Brazilian expatriate sportspeople in Qatar
Brazilian expatriate sportspeople in Portugal
Brazilian expatriate sportspeople in Japan
Expatriate footballers in Qatar
Expatriate footballers in Portugal
Expatriate footballers in Japan